This is a list of members of the Victorian Legislative Council at the election of 5 June 1919 until 31 May 1922 election. As half of the Legislative Council's terms expired at each triennial election, half of these members were elected at the 1916 triennial election with terms expiring in 1922, while the other half were elected at the 1919 triennial election with terms expiring in 1925.

The Electoral Provinces Boundaries Act 1903 defined 17 Provinces with two members each for a total of 34 members.

Note the "Term in Office" refers to that members term(s) in the Council, not necessarily for that Province.

Walter Manifold was President; James Brown was Chairman of Committees.

 Hicks died 6 September 1921; replaced by Herbert Keck in October 1921.
 McWhae resigned November 1921; replaced by Herbert Smith in December 1921.
 Rees resigned in October 1919; replaced by William Crockett in November 1919.
 Sachse died 25 July 1920; replaced by John Harris in September 1920.
 Weedon died 26 March 1921; replaced by Henry Cohen in May 1921.

References

 Re-member (a database of all Victorian MPs since 1851). Parliament of Victoria.

Members of the Parliament of Victoria by term
20th-century Australian politicians